Ladew may refer to:

People
Joseph Harvey Ladew (1867-1940), American leather manufacturer and yachtsman
Harvey Smith Ladew I (c. 1835-1888), American leather manufacturer and father of Joseph Harvey Ladew and Edward R. Ladew
Harvey Smith Ladew II (1887-1976), American topiary gardener and son of Edward R. Ladew
Edward R. Ladew (1855-1905), son of Harvey Smith Ladew I

Things
Fayerweather & Ladew, an American leather company
Ladew Topiary Gardens, in Monkton, Maryland, United States
Ladew's Oldfield mouse (Thomasomys ladewi), a mouse in Bolivia